The Alliance Premier League season of 1984–85 (known as the Gola League 1984–85 for sponsorship reasons) was the sixth season of the Alliance Premier League. This was the first year where the Isthmian League acted as an APL feeder league.

New teams in the league this season
 Barrow (promoted 1983–84)
 Dartford (promoted 1983–84)

Final table

Results

Top scorers

Promotion and relegation

Promoted
 Cheltenham Town (from the Southern Premier League)
 Stafford Rangers (from the Northern Premier League)
 Wycombe Wanderers (from the Isthmian League)

Relegated
 Gateshead (to the Northern Premier League)
 Worcester City (to the Southern Premier League)
 Yeovil Town (to the Isthmian League)

Election to the Football League

This year Wealdstone, the champions of the Alliance Premier League, could not apply for election because their stadium did not meet Football League requirements. 2nd placed Nuneaton could not apply either for the same reason, and nor could 3rd placed Dartford, so 4th placed Bath City won by default the right to apply for election to the Football League to replace one of the four bottom sides in the 1984–85 Football League Fourth Division. The voting went as follows:

As a result of this, Bath City failed to gain membership of the Football League.

References

External links
 1984–85 Conference National Results
 Re-election Results – The Division Four final league table, including the results of the re-election vote.

National League (English football) seasons
5